Hiram A. Haverstick Farmstead is a historic home located at Indianapolis, Marion County, Indiana.  It was built about 1879, and is a two-story, five bay, Italianate style stone dwelling faced in brick. It is nearly square and has a summer kitchen attached by an enclosed breezeway. It has a low-pitched hipped roof with wide eaves supported by ornate wooden brackets and an ornate one-bay front porch.

It was added to the National Register of Historic Places in 1985.

References

Houses on the National Register of Historic Places in Indiana
Italianate architecture in Indiana
Houses completed in 1879
Houses in Indianapolis
National Register of Historic Places in Indianapolis